Andrew Rudd is the co-founder and former chairman and CEO of Barra, Inc. He served as the CEO of Barra from 1984 to 1999. In 2004, Barra was acquired by Morgan Stanley Capital International and renamed MSCI Barra. Rudd is the founder and former CEO of Advisor Software. Advisor Software was acquired by Refinitiv in 2020.

Rudd received his B.Sc. from University of Sussex in England. He also studied at the University of California, Berkeley, where he earned an MS in Operations Research, an MBA and PhD in Operations research and Finance.  From 1977 to 1982, he was a Professor of Finance and Operations Research at the Johnson School at Cornell University in Ithaca, New York.

Rudd chairs the Rudd Family Foundation, which supports educational and youth activities. The foundation has endowed faculty chairs at the Haas School of Business, 
University of Massachusetts, The Johnson School at Cornell University, and the Blum Centre for Developing Economies at the University of California, Berkeley. He is also a trustee of The Blum Center, a member of The Johnson School Advisory Council. He has written several journal articles and co-authored two books on investment management.

External links 
List of articles and research papers by Andrew Rudd http://unjobs.org/authors/andrew-rudd

References 

American chief executives of financial services companies
Living people
Haas School of Business alumni
Cornell University faculty
Year of birth missing (living people)